Fission is a Swedish melodic death metal band formed in 2002. The band began as Benny Hägglund's personal project, with the hopes of fusing melody and aggression into his music. After writing some material, he decided to seek aid from Andreas Hedlund of Vintersorg, the band in which Hägglund plays live session drums. After recording a two-track demo with Benny handling all instrumentation and Andreas handling vocal duties, they signed on with Austrian label, Napalm Records. Benny continued writing all of the songs for their first album, while Andreas provided all of the lyrics, vocals, keyboards, and sound effects. They released their debut album, Crater, on April 27, 2004.

Discography
 Crater (2004)
"Mechanism" – 0:43
"Crater" – 4:44
"Accelerator" – 5:02
"Empty Nimbus" – 3:16
"Magnetism" – 5:55
"Catastrophe Consumer" – 3:49
"The Core: 118 Protons of Insanity" – 0:44
"Mind Vortex" – 4:42
"The Chaos Algorithm" – 3:34
"Eremiten" – 3:26
"Syndrome" - 6:50
 Pain Parade (2008)

References

Swedish melodic death metal musical groups
Heavy metal duos
Musical groups established in 2002
2002 establishments in Sweden